Asymbescaline (3,4-diethoxy-5-methoxyphenethylamine) is a lesser-known psychedelic drug.  It is a homolog of mescaline. Asymbescaline was first synthesized by Alexander Shulgin. In his book PiHKAL, the dosage range is listed as 200–280 mg, and the duration listed as 10–15 hours. Asymbescaline produces few to no effects. Very little data exists about the pharmacological properties, metabolism, and toxicity of asymbescaline.

See also 
 Phenethylamine

References

Psychedelic phenethylamines
Mescalines